"Milkshake" is a song by American singer Kelis from her third studio album, Tasty (2003). Written and produced by the Neptunes, the song was originally offered to Britney Spears for her fourth studio album, In the Zone, but was instead given to Kelis. It was released as the lead single from Tasty in the United States on August 25, 2003, by Star Trak and Arista Records, and internationally on November 24, 2003. According to Kelis, "milkshake" in the song is used as a metaphor for "something that makes women special". The song is noted for its euphemistic chorus and low beat R&B sound.

"Milkshake" peaked at number three on the US Billboard Hot 100 in December 2003, becoming Kelis' highest-charting single to date. Elsewhere, the single topped the charts in Ireland and peaked inside the top 10 of the charts in Australia, Denmark, Netherlands, New Zealand, Norway, Sweden and the United Kingdom. "Milkshake" was certified Gold in the United States, where it has sold 883,000 paid downloads. The song was nominated for a Grammy Award for Best Urban/Alternative Performance in 2004.

Background

"Milkshake" was written and produced by Pharrell Williams and Chad Hugo, known collectively as the Neptunes. The song was conceived when Tasty was chosen as the album's title. When making the song, Kelis "knew right away that it was a really good song", and she wanted it to be the album's first single. Recording sessions took place at Hovercraft Studios in Virginia Beach, Virginia. Phil Tan mixed the recordings at Right Track Studios in New York City.

When asked about the meaning of the song, Kelis told The Observer that "It means whatever people want it to; it was just a word we came up with on a whim, but then the song took on a life of its own." However, in an interview with the Associated Press, she likened one's milkshake to one's self-confidence: "A milkshake is the thing that makes women special. It's what gives us our confidence and what makes us exciting."

Composition
"Milkshake" is an R&B song, and Joey Rivaldo of About.com described it as a "low beat dance song". The song is noted for its chorus, in which Kelis sings "My milkshake brings all the boys to the yard". The line was referred to as a "sexy, euphemistic playground rap" by MTV News. The song's riff was described as "blaring synth-funk". Unlike many urban pop songs, which rely on drum machines, the beat consists of a lone darbuka playing a rhythm similar to a belly dance. A manjira sample resembling an order-up counter bell is used throughout the song. Andy Kellman of AllMusic compared the song's suggestive lyrics to "Nasty Girl" by Vanity 6, "In My House" by Mary Jane Girls and "Touch It" by Monifah. According to the sheet music published at Musicnotes.com by EMI Music Publishing, "Milkshake" has a moderate beat rate of 113 beats per minute.

Critical reception
"Milkshake" received critical acclaim upon its release, both for its inventive and groundbreaking production as well as Kelis' vocal performance.
About.com's Joey Rivaldo rated the song four out of five stars, and stated: "Clearly this is the case of my milkshake is better than yours, so grab yours quick, or we'll have to charge." While reviewing the soundtrack to the film Mean Girls (2004), in which "Milkshake" is featured, Heather Phares of AllMusic wrote that the song describes "the movie's playfully menacing undercurrent", and called the song "fantastic", and that it is "basically a three-minute tutorial in sex appeal." Rollie Pemberton of Pitchfork called the song "brilliant", and said: "Equal parts cantina gyration and future-funk, Kelis plays the coquette, enticing the entire American male populace with rhythmic coos while simultaneously providing an apt tutorial for aspiring temptresses." Bjorn Randolph of Stylus Magazine said that the song "may well be remembered as their [the Neptunes'] masterpiece".

Mark Danson of Contactmusic.com was not very fond of the song, criticizing the Neptunes' sound, and said: "as it sounds like [Pharrell] Williams has done this one in his sleep, it'll probably slip under the radar unless it has a fairly decent video to back it up. It's obviously supposed to be a kind of sexy electronica, but it just ends up sounding slack." Tony Naylor of NME called the song "probably the oddest track" on the Tasty album. Adam Webb of Yahoo! Music UK said that the song "nestles in seamlessly, the rhythm as relentless as a parade of majorettes with Kelis upfront as the cheerleader." Neil Drumming of Entertainment Weekly called the song a "lusty party anthem". Ernest Hardy of Rolling Stone called it "the superfreakiest song on the charts", Sal Cinquemani of Slant Magazine called it "thick and creamy", Steve Jones of USA Today called it "saucy", and Dorian Lynskey of The Guardian said that in the song "Kelis exploits her husky croon like never before, pouring it over lascivious double entendre."

The Observer named the song the best single of 2004. In 2004, Pitchfork made a list of the top 50 singles of 2003 and listed the song at number eight. In 2005, Pitchfork made a list of the top 100 singles of 2000–2004, listing "Milkshake" at number 21. Stylus Magazine named the song the 13th-best single of 2000–2005. In September 2011, VH1 ranked the song at number 61 on its list of the "100 Greatest Songs of the '00s". In October 2011, NME placed it at number 136 on its list "150 Best Tracks of the Past 15 Years".

In 2004, "Milkshake" was nominated for a Grammy Award for Best Urban/Alternative Performance.

Commercial performance
"Milkshake" debuted at number 73 on the September 6, 2003, chart of the Billboard Hot R&B/Hip-Hop Songs chart, and peaked at number four on January 3, 2004. In October 2003, it debuted at number 95 on the Billboard Hot 100 chart. It was Kelis' second entry on the chart, following "Caught out There", which spent 12 weeks on the chart between December 1999 and February 2000. In its 13th week on the chart, "Milkshake" reached its peak of number three, and stayed there for five consecutive weeks. The song charted on the Hot 100 for 22 weeks, and was certified Gold by the Recording Industry Association of America (RIAA) on October 25, 2004. "Milkshake" also spent a week atop the Hot Dance Club Songs chart in December 2003. The song has sold 883,000 paid digital downloads in the United States, according to Nielsen SoundScan. It was listed at number 41 on the 2004 Hot 100 year-end chart, and number 41 on the Hot R&B/Hip-Hop Songs year-end chart.

The single debuted at number 15 on the Irish Singles Chart, and later topped the chart for five consecutive weeks. In the United Kingdom, "Milkshake" peaked at number two on the UK Singles Chart, where it remained for four consecutive weeks, and has been certified Platinum by the British Phonographic Industry (BPI). Elsewhere in Europe, the track reached the top five in Denmark, Norway, and Sweden, and the top 10 in Netherlands.

In Australia, "Milkshake" peaked at number two on the ARIA Singles Chart for five non-consecutive weeks and has been certified Platinum by the Australian Recording Industry Association (ARIA). It also peaked at number three on the New Zealand Singles Chart and has been certified Gold by the Recording Industry Association of New Zealand (RIANZ).

Music video
The music video for "Milkshake" was directed by Jake Nava. In the video, Kelis enters a diner called Tasty's Yard. She dances suggestively, and puts her lips around a cherry, which causes a mother to cover her child's eyes. A cook, played by rapper Nas, starts delivering milkshakes to the customers while Kelis dances. A milkshake machine then starts spurting milkshake all over the customers, and more and more people enter the "yard". FHM named the music video the 73rd sexiest music video by a female performer of all time and commented: "Here she's backed up by a posse of dancers wearing tiny diner uniforms. The way she sucks a milkshake and bites a cherry is just unfairly sexy", and said that the best part is when Kelis demonstrates a "perfect bending-over-oven technique".

Usage in media
The song has been featured in numerous television series and films including The Simpsons, Family Guy, Jane the Virgin, South Park, The Glee Project, Nip/Tuck, The Haunted Mansion, Mean Girls, Dodgeball: A True Underdog Story, King's Ransom, The Big Short, Date Movie, 2 Broke Girls, Norbit and Identity Thief. It appeared in season 3, episode 8 of Sex Education.

The song was covered by Australian rock band The Pictures in 2005 as part of youth radio station Triple J's Like a Version segment. The song was also covered by Ashleigh Murray, Asha Bromfield and Madelaine Petsch in the episode "Chapter Fifteen: Nighthawks" from the second season of the television series Riverdale. The song was also covered by Robyn Adele Anderson in 2020.

Track listings

UK CD single
"Milkshake" – 3:05
"Milkshake" (X-Press 2 Triple Thick Vocal Mix Edit) – 6:49

UK enhanced CD single
"Milkshake" – 3:05
"Milkshake" (X-Press 2 Triple Thick Vocal Mix) – 9:30
"Milkshake" (DJ Zinc Remix) – 5:59
"Milkshake" (Freq Nasty's Hip Hall Mix) – 6:24
"Milkshake" (Tom Neville Mix) – 6:26
"Milkshake" (music video) – 3:11

Australian and German CD maxi single
"Milkshake" – 3:05
"Milkshake" (X-Press 2 Triple Thick Vocal Mix) – 9:30
"Milkshake" (DJ Zinc Remix) – 5:59
"Milkshake" (Freq Nasty's Hip Hall Mix) – 6:24
"Milkshake" (Tom Neville Remix) – 6:26

US 12-inch single
A1. "Milkshake" (Radio Mix) – 3:05
A2. "Milkshake" (Instrumental) – 3:05
B1. "Milkshake" (Radio Mix) – 3:05
B2. "Milkshake" (Acappella) – 2:57

US 7-inch single
A. "Milkshake" (Radio Mix) – 3:05
B. "Milkshake" (Instrumental) – 3:05

UK 12-inch single
A1. "Milkshake" – 3:05
A2. "Milkshake" (X-Press 2 Triple Thick Vocal Mix) – 9:30
B1. "Milkshake" (Tom Neville Remix) – 6:24
B2. "Milkshake" (X-Press 2 Triple Thick Dub [With Extra Cream]) – 9:30

Digital download
"Milkshake" – 3:05

Digital download – Radio Mix
"Milkshake" (Radio Mix featuring Pharrell and Pusha T) – 4:46
"Milkshake" (Instrumental) – 4:41

Personnel
Credits adapted from the liner notes of Tasty.

Recording
 Recorded at Hovercraft Studios (Virginia Beach, Virginia)
 Mixed at Right Track Studios (New York City)
 Mastered at Sterling Sound (New York City)

Personnel
 The Neptunes – production
 Andrew "Drew" Coleman – recording
 Daniel Betancourt – recording assistance
 Phil Tan – mixing
 Tim Olmstead – mixing assistance
 Chris Athens – mastering

Charts

Weekly charts

Year-end charts

Decade-end charts

Certifications

Release history

References

2003 singles
2003 songs
Arista Records singles
Irish Singles Chart number-one singles
Kelis songs
Music videos directed by Jake Nava
Song recordings produced by the Neptunes
Songs written by Chad Hugo
Songs written by Pharrell Williams
Star Trak Entertainment singles